Horr Rural District is a rural district (dehestan) in Dinavar District, Sahneh County, Kermanshah Province, Iran. At the 2006 census, its population was 5,261, in 1,299 families. The rural district has 31 villages.

References 

Rural Districts of Kermanshah Province
Sahneh County